In graph theory, a vertex subset  is a vertex separator (or vertex cut, separating set) for nonadjacent vertices  and  if the removal of  from the graph separates  and  into distinct connected components.

Examples

If  is odd, there is a single central row, and otherwise there are two rows equally close to the center; similarly, if  is odd, there is a single central column, and otherwise there are two columns equally close to the center. If  (as in the illustration), then choosing a central column will give a separator  with  vertices, and similarly if  then choosing a central row will give a separator with at most  vertices. Thus, every grid graph has a separator  of size at most  the removal of which partitions it into two connected components, each of size at most .

To give another class of examples, every free tree  has a separator  consisting of a single vertex, the removal of which partitions  into two or more connected components, each of size at most . More precisely, there is always exactly one or exactly two vertices, which amount to such a separator, depending on whether the tree is centered or bicentered. 

As opposed to these examples, not all vertex separators are balanced, but that property is most useful for applications in computer science, such as the planar separator theorem.

Minimal separators
More generally,  is called a minimal separator if it is a minimal separator for some pair  of nonadjacent vertices. The following is a well-known result characterizing the minimal separators: 

Lemma.

It follows from the definition that the predecessor relation yields a preorder on the set of all -separators.

See also

 Chordal graph, a graph in which every minimal separator is a clique.
 k-vertex-connected graph

Notes

References

.
.

Graph connectivity